József Tabaka (born 17 September 1989) is a Hungarian motorcycle speedway rider who is a member of Hungary's national team. He will ride for the Edinburgh Monarchs in their 2010 Premier League campaign Edinburgh Monarchs.

Honours

World Championships 
 Individual Under-21 World Championship
 2009 -  Goričan - 13th place (3 pts), as track reserve rode in two heat
 2010 - 10th place in the Qualifying Round 1

See also 
 Hungary national speedway team, U21
 Edinburgh Monarchs

References 

1989 births
Living people
Hungarian speedway riders
Edinburgh Monarchs riders